Robert E. Bray (October 23, 1917 – March 7, 1983) was an American film and television actor known for playing the forest ranger Corey Stuart in the CBS series Lassie, He also starred in  Stagecoach West and as Mike Hammer in the movie version of Mickey Spillane's novel My Gun Is Quick (1957).

Life and career
Bray entered films in 1946 under contract to RKO. He was marketed as the "next Gary Cooper" but appeared in B Westerns like 1949's Rustlers. In the 1950s, the then freelancing actor appeared in a varied number of roles including the 1952 episode "Thunder Over Inyo" of the syndicated western television series The Adventures of Kit Carson.

In 1954, he portrayed bandit Emmett Dalton in an episode of Jim Davis's syndicated western Stories of the Century. That same year, he guest-starred in Reed Hadley's CBS crime drama, The Public Defender. On December 4, 1955, he was cast as petroleum pioneer Pattillo Higgins in "Spindletop – The First Great Texas Oil Strike (January 10, 1901)" on the CBS history series, You Are There, the story of the origin of the Texas oil industry.

In 1958, he starred in Never Love a Stranger, a film adaptation of a Harold Robbins novel.

Bray guest-starred in the episode "Obituary" of NBC's western series, Jefferson Drum, starring Jeff Richards, and in the 1959 episode "The Trouble with Tolliver" of the ABC western drama, The Man from Blackhawk.

He appeared twice on ABC's The Life and Legend of Wyatt Earp.

Bray was cast as Carl the Bus Driver in Bus Stop with Marilyn Monroe (1956) and as detective Mike Hammer in My Gun Is Quick (1957). Other roles were on NBC's western anthology series, Frontier and on the syndicated series City Detective and State Trooper.

Early in 1960, Bray was cast as Tom Byson in the episode "Three Graves" of the NBC western series, Riverboat.

In the 1960–1961 television season, Bray played Simon Kane in the ABC series Stagecoach West.  The Western comprised 38 one-hour episodes. 

He starred in three episodes of NBC's western Laramie between 1960 and 1963. He appeared in three episodes of CBS's Perry Mason. In 1959 he played private detective and murder victim Carl Davis in "The Case of the Foot-Loose Doll." In the 1962 episode, "The Case of the Angry Astronaut," he had the role of title character and defendant Mitch Heller; and in 1963 he portrayed wealthy murder victim Martin Walden (Episode 180, "The Case of the Potted Planter"). He also guest-starred in NBC's Temple Houston (TV series), Overland Trail, and The Loretta Young Show. He appeared in four episodes of CBS's anthology suspense series Alfred Hitchcock Presents between 1958 and 1961.  

In 1963, he guest starred on Gunsmoke as “Gib Dawson”, a settler who marries a Comanche Squaw and has to deal with the racial hatred from others because of it in the episode “Shona” (S8E22).

Bray portrayed forest ranger Corey Stuart in Season 11 of Lassie. He was written out of the series in Season 15 as a victim of a forest fire, and his character was sent away to a hospital never to return.

Selected filmography

 Sunset Pass (1946) – Bank Clerk (uncredited)
 Crack Up (1946) – Man with Drunk (uncredited)
 Dick Tracy vs. Cueball (1946) – Steve (uncredited)
 Vacation in Reno (1946) – Police Guard in Bank (uncredited)
 The Falcon's Adventure (1946) – Doorman (uncredited)
 San Quentin (1946) – Saunders, a Gunman (uncredited)
 Banjo (1947) – Policeman (uncredited)
 Honeymoon (1947) – Bridegroom (uncredited)
 Desperate (1947) – Policeman with Lt. Ferrari (uncredited)
 Seven Keys to Baldpate (1947) – Policeman (uncredited)
 Crossfire (1947) – MP (uncredited)
 The Bachelor and the Bobby-Soxer (1947) – Official at Airline Gate (uncredited)
 Dick Tracy Meets Gruesome (1947) – Sergeant (uncredited)
 Wild Horse Mesa (1947) – Tex
 The Judge Steps Out (1947) – Truck Driver (uncredited)
 If You Knew Susie (1948) – Reporter (uncredited)
 Western Heritage (1948) – Henchman Pike
 Mr. Blandings Builds His Dream House (1948) – Workman (uncredited)
 Fighting Father Dunne (1948) – Classroom Instructor (uncredited)
 Arizona Ranger (1948) – Jasper Todd
 Guns of Hate (1948) – Rocky
 Return of the Bad Men (1948) – 'The Youngers': John Younger
 Blood on the Moon (1948) – Bart Daniels
 Indian Agent (1948) – Nichols
 Gun Smugglers (1948) – Henchman Dodge
 Brothers in the Saddle (1949) – Henchman Polk Lynch
 Rustlers (1949) – Henchman Hank
 Stagecoach Kid (1949) – Henchman Clint
 The Clay Pigeon (1949) – Gunsel Blake
 Strange Bargain (1949) – Det. McTay
 Johnny Holiday (1949) – Policeman (uncredited)
 The Great Missouri Raid (1951) – Charlie Pitts
 Law of the Badlands (1951) – Benson
 Warpath (1951) – Maj. Comstock
 Overland Telegraph (1951) – Steve – Henchman
 Man from the Black Hills (1952) – Ed Roper
 The Gunman (1952) – Tom Jamison
 One Minute to Zero (1952) – (uncredited)
 Fargo (1952) – Ed Murdock
 Feudin' Fools (1952) – Private Eye 
 Back at the Front (1952) – Military Police Corporal (uncredited)
 The Lusty Men (1952) – Fritz (uncredited)
 Voodoo Tiger (1952) – Maj. Bill Green
 The Maverick (1952) – Cpl. Johnson
 Seminole (1953) – Capt. Sibley (uncredited)
 The Neanderthal Man (1953) – Tim Newcomb – cattle rancher (uncredited)
 The Marshal's Daughter (1953) – Anderson
 Main Street to Broadway (1953) – Lawyer in Fantasy Sequence
 Vigilante Terror (1953) – Gene Smith
 Bad for Each Other (1953) – Trooper at Mine Accident Scene (uncredited)
 Ride Clear of Diablo (1954) – Jackson – Ranch Hand (uncredited)
 Rose Marie (1954) – Mountie (uncredited)
 Arrow in the Dust (1954) – Cavalry Corporal (uncredited)
 The Yellow Tomahawk (1954) – Lieutenant Banion
 Drums Across the River (1954) – Sheriff Ed Crockett (uncredited)
 The Caine Mutiny (1954) – Court-Martial Board Member (uncredited)
 Francis Joins the WACS (1954) – Military Police Sgt. Kreuger (uncredited)
 Shield for Murder (1954) – Detective (uncredited)
 Big House, U.S.A. (1955) – Ranger McCormick
 The Steel Jungle (1956) – Police Lt. Soberman
 Bus Stop (1956) – Carl
 The Accursed (1957) – Major Shane
 The Wayward Bus (1957) – Morse
 My Gun is Quick (1957) – Mike Hammer
 Never Love a Stranger (1958) – 'Silk' Fennelli
 Never So Few (1959) – Col. Fred Parkson
 Fiend of Dope Island (1961) – David
 A Gathering of Eagles (1963) – Lt. Col. Gales

References

External links
 
 

1917 births
1983 deaths
American male film actors
American male television actors
Male actors from Los Angeles
Male actors from Montana
Male Western (genre) film actors
Civilian Conservation Corps people
People from Bishop, California
People from Kalispell, Montana
Male actors from Seattle
United States Marine Corps personnel of World War II
United States Marines
Cowboys
20th-century American male actors